Rescue Story is the second studio album of the American Christian rock singer Zach Williams released on October 4, 2019 on Essential record label. The album peaked at No. 2 on the U.S. Christian Albums chart and at 111 on the U.S. Billboard 200 albums chart. The 10-track album includes the title track single "Rescue Story". Three other tracks "Walk With You", "Heaven Help Me" and "There Was Jesus" (the latter featuring Dolly Parton) also appeared on the Billboard Christian Songs chart.

Accolades

Track listing

Charts

References

2019 albums
Zach Williams (musician) albums
Essential Records (Christian) albums